Sheryl McFarlane is a Canadian author of fourteen books for children and young adults.

Career

Sheryl was born in the Ottawa Valley, grew up in Arizona and has lived on the West Coast of Canada since 1974.  A former teacher, Sheryl often visits schools and speaks at seminars across Canada on topics related to children's literature.

A graduate of the University of British Columbia, Sheryl received her B.Ed. in Science and Canadian Studies

Among her best selling children's books are Waiting for the Whales, A Pod of Orcas, Jessie's Island, This is the Dog and Eagle Dreams.

Her first young adult novel, The Smell of Paint, won a Moonbeam Award gold medal in the Young Adult category and was selected by the Canadian Children's Book Center as a 2007 best book of the year.

Sheryl lives in Victoria, British Columbia, Canada

Bibliography

Novels
The Smell of Paint: Fitzhenry & Whiteside, 2006.

Picture Books
Island Santa: Orca Book Publishers, 2012
This Is the Dog: Fitzhenry & Whiteside, 2004
A Pod of Orcas: Fitzhenry & Whiteside, 2003
Going to the Fair: Orca Book Publishers, 1996  	
Tides of Change:  Orca Book Publishers, 1995
Eagle Dreams: Orca Book Publishers, 1994
Moonsnail Song:  Orca Book Publishers, 1994
Jessie’s Island: Orca Book Publishers, 1992
Waiting For the Whales: Orca Book Publishers, 1991

Board Books
What’s That Sound? By the Sea: Fitzhenry & Whiteside, 2006
What’s That Sound? At the Circus: Fitzhenry & Whiteside, 2006
What’s That Sound? On the Farm: Fitzhenry & Whiteside,  2005
What’s That Sound? In the City: Fitzhenry & Whiteside,  2005

Awards and nominations
Waiting for the Whales
Governor General's Award for Illustration
IODE Award for Text
Short-listed for Mr. Christie Award, BC Book Prize
Recognized by Canadian Children's Book Centre, CBC Morningside Book Panel
Canadian Library Notable Book

Eagle Dreams
Recognized by CBC Morningside Book Panel

Tides of Change
Recommended by the Royal British Columbia Museum

A Pod of Orcas
Short-listed for the Chocolate Lily Award 2003/4
BC Ministry of Education Ready Set Learn Title

This is the Dog
Short-listed for the Blue Spruce Award,
Short-listed for the Chocolate Lily Award 2004/5
Short-listed for the Amelia Francis Howard-Gibbon Award
Canadian Toy Council Recommended Title

What's That Sound? In the City in the City &
What's That Sound? On the Farm
Recognized by Today's Parent

What's That Sound? By the Sea
2008 Canadian Toy Testing Council Great Book Award
2007 Moonbeam Silver Medal Award in the Board Book Category (USA)

The Smell of Paint
2007 Moonbeam Gold Medal Award for Young Adult Fiction (USA)
Victoria Butler Book Prize nominee

References
Sheryl McFarlane at the Canadian Children's Book Center 
Sheryl McFarlane at the Children's Writers and Illustrators of British Columbia 
Sheryl McFarlane at the Authors' Booking Service 
Sheryl McFarlane at DoDoLand.com 
Sheryl McFarlane at the Canadian Society of Children's Authors, Illustrators and Performers 
The 2007 Moonbeam Children's Book Awards

External links
Sheryl McFarlane Official Web Site
Sheryl McFarlane at Fitzhenry & Whiteside
Sheryl's Books at Chapters/Indigo

Canadian children's writers
Living people
University of British Columbia alumni
1954 births